Les nuits d'été (Summer Nights), Op. 7, is a song cycle by the French composer Hector Berlioz. It is a setting of six poems by Théophile Gautier. The cycle, completed in 1841, was originally for soloist and piano accompaniment. Berlioz orchestrated one of the songs in 1843, and did the same for the other five in 1856. The cycle was neglected for many years, but during the 20th century it became, and has remained, one of the composer's most popular works. The full orchestral version is more frequently performed in concert and on record than the piano original. The theme of the work is the progress of love, from youthful innocence to loss and finally renewal.

Background
Berlioz and the poet Théophile Gautier were neighbours and friends. Gautier wrote, "Berlioz represents the romantic musical idea ... unexpected effects in sound, tumultuous and Shakespearean depth of passion." It is possible that Berlioz read Gautier's collection La comédie de la mort (The Comedy of Death) before its publication in 1838. Gautier had no objection to his friend's setting six poems from that volume, and Berlioz began in March 1840. The title Nuits d'été was Berlioz's invention, and it is not clear why he chose it: the first song is specifically set in spring rather than summer. The writer Annagret Fauser suggests that Berlioz may have been influenced by the preface to a collection of short stories by his friend Joseph Méry, Les nuits de Londres, in which the author writes of summer nights in which he and his friends sat outside until dawn telling stories. In a 1989 study of Berlioz, D. Kern Holoman suggests that the title is an allusion to Shakespeare, whose works Berlioz loved.

The cycle was complete in its original version for voice (mezzo-soprano or tenor) and piano by 1841. Berlioz later made arrangements for baritone, contralto, or soprano, and piano. The piano version is not as often performed in concert or on record as the orchestrated score, which Berlioz arranged between 1843 and 1856. David Cairns wrote in 1988 that the success of the piano version was impeded by the inferior quality of the piano part in the published score: it is not Berlioz's own, and Cairns described it as "a clumsy, inauthentic piece of work".

In 1843 Berlioz orchestrated the fourth song, "Absence" for his lover, Marie Recio, who premiered it in Leipzig on 23 February 1843; it was not until 1856, that he returned to Les nuits d'été, making an orchestral arrangement of "Le spectre de la rose" for the mezzo-soprano Anna Bockholtz-Falconi. The publisher  was in the audience for the premiere, and, much impressed, prevailed on Berlioz to orchestrate the rest of the cycle. The orchestration left the existing melodic and harmonic writing generally unchanged, but for "Le spectre de la rose" the composer added an introduction for muted solo cello, flute and clarinet; the orchestration of this song, unlike the other five, includes a harp.

The original piano version had a single dedicatee – Louise Bertin, whose father, Louis-François Bertin, was editor of the Journal des débats, for which Berlioz wrote musical criticism and other articles. Each of the six songs of the orchestral cycle was dedicated individually, to singers well known in Germany, some of whom had performed Berlioz's music there: Louise Wolf ("Villanelle"), Anna Bockholtz-Falconi ("Le spectre de la rose"), Hans von Milde ("Sur les lagunes"), Madeleine Nottès ("Absence"), Friedrich Caspari ("Au cimetière") and Rosa von Milde ("L'île inconnue").

For the orchestral version, Berlioz transposed the second and third songs to lower keys. When this version was published, Berlioz specified different voices for the various songs: mezzo-soprano or tenor for "Villanelle", contralto for "Le spectre de la rose", baritone (or optionally contralto or mezzo) for "Sur les lagunes", mezzo or tenor for "Absence", tenor for "Au cimetière", and mezzo or tenor for "L'île inconnue". The cycle is nevertheless usually sung by a single soloist, most often a soprano or mezzo-soprano. When the cycle is sung by sopranos the second and third songs are usually transposed back to their original pitches; when lower voices sing the cycle some other songs are often transposed downwards; in the view of the Berlioz scholar Julian Rushton this has a particularly deleterious effect in the first song, the lighthearted "Villanelle".

Although Berlioz wrote more than fifty songs, twenty of them with orchestral accompaniment, those in Les nuits d'été are the only ones published as a set. They are not a cycle on the German model of Schubert's Winterreise or Schumann's Dichterliebe, with narrative and thematic continuity, but form a unified whole by virtue of the single authorship of the words and the composer's use throughout of delicate, atmospheric musical shading. The structure of the cycle has four sombre songs framed by exuberant opening and closing ones. The critic A. E. F. Dickinson wrote in a 1969 study, "Their common theme is nominally love unrequited or lost, symbolizing, arguably, an ache for vanished or unattainable beauty. But their musical order is apparently fortuitous, and forms an acceptable, rather than a compulsive, association." Berlioz's innovative creation of an orchestral song cycle had few successors until Mahler took the genre up in the late 19th century.

As far as is known, the orchestral cycle was not performed in its entirety during the composer's lifetime. The work was neglected for many years, but during the twentieth century it was rediscovered and has become one of Berlioz's best-loved works.

Music
By Berlioz's standards the orchestration is on a modest scale. There is no percussion, and the forces stipulated are the normal string section of violins, violas, cellos and double-basses; woodwind: two flutes, two clarinets, two bassoons, one oboe; brass: three horns; harp.

Villanelle

Allegretto; A major. Orchestration: 2 flutes, 1 oboe, 2 clarinets in A, 1 bassoon, strings.
The first of the set, "Villanelle", is a celebration of spring and love. It tells of the pleasures of wandering together in the woods to gather wild strawberries, returning home with hands entwined. The setting is strophic; Berlioz maintains the villanelle rhythm of the original poem, while varying the orchestral accompaniment with string counterpoints, and, at the end of each verse, a bassoon solo, pitched higher at each iteration. Rushton comments that these variations "add to the sense of the natural variety and freshness of spring".

Le spectre de la rose

Adagio un poco lento et dolce assai; B major. Orchestration: 2 flutes, 1 oboe, 2 clarinets in A, 2 horns in E, 1 harp, strings.
"Le spectre de la rose" (The Ghost of the Rose) tells of a girl's dreams of the ghost of the rose she had worn to a ball the previous day. Although the rose has died, it has ascended to paradise; to have died on the girl's breast was a fate that kings might envy. The setting is through-composed. Holoman describes the song as "among the most perfect expressions of French Romanticism".

Sur les lagunes: Lamento

Andantino; F minor. Orchestration: 2 flutes, 2 clarinets in B, 2 bassoons, 1 horn in C , 1 horn in F, strings.
"Sur les lagunes: Lamento" (On the Lagoons: Lament), with its sombre harmonies and orchestration is imbued with melancholy; the undulating accompaniment suggests the movement of the waves. The poem is the lament of a Venetian boatman at the loss of his beloved, and the pain of sailing out to sea unloved. This is the second of the two through-composed songs in the cycle.

Absence

Adagio; F major. Orchestration: 2 flutes, 1 oboe, 2 clarinets in A, 1 horn in A, 1 horn in D, strings.
The rhetorical "Absence" pleads for the return of the beloved. Rushton suggests that unlike the other five songs, this one may make use of existing music, written for an abandoned cantata, Erigone, and this possibly explains why in this song alone Berlioz cut and rearranged Gautier's verses. This song, and "Au cimetière", which follows, are strophic, with the form A–B–A.

Au cimetière: Clair de lune

Andantino non troppo lento; D major. Orchestration: 2 flutes, 2 clarinets in A; strings.
"Au cimetière: Clair de lune" (At the Cemetery: Moonlight), is a further lament, with the bereaved lover now more distant from the memory of his beloved, and perturbed by a ghostly vision of her.

L'île inconnue 

Allegro spiritoso; F major. orchestration: 2 flutes, 1 oboe, 2 clarinets in B, 2 bassoons, 1 horn in F, 1 horn in C, 1 horn in B, strings.
"L'île inconnue" (The Unknown Island) hints at the unattainable – a place where love can be eternal. Rushton describes the song as "cheerfully ironic", set by Berlioz "with a Venetian swing". This closing song is strophic with the form A–B–A–C–A′–D–A″.

Recordings

The growing popularity of the work was reflected in the number of complete recordings issued in the LP era. Among those are versions sung by Suzanne Danco, Eleanor Steber and Victoria de los Ángeles in mono recordings and Régine Crespin, Leontyne Price, Janet Baker and Frederica von Stade in stereo. More recent recordings have featured Véronique Gens, Anne Sofie von Otter, Bernarda Fink and Lorraine Hunt Lieberson. Recordings by male singers include those by Nicolai Gedda, Ian Bostridge, Stéphane Degout and José van Dam. The piano version has been recorded from time to time, and there have been three studio recordings of the orchestral version with multiple singers, as stipulated in the orchestral score; these were conducted by Sir Colin Davis, Sir John Eliot Gardiner and Pierre Boulez. Conductors of other versions have included Ernest Ansermet, Sir John Barbirolli, James Levine, Dimitri Mitropoulos, Charles Munch, Fritz Reiner and Seiji Ozawa.

Notes, references and sources

Notes

References

Sources

External links

Scores and texts of Berlioz songs for voice and piano, BerliozSongs.co.uk
Texts of Les nuits d'été

Song cycles by Hector Berlioz
Mélodies
1841 compositions
Classical song cycles in French
Music dedicated to ensembles or performers
Music based on poems
Adaptations of works by Théophile Gautier